The Florida Complex League Phillies are a Rookie-level affiliate of the Philadelphia Phillies, competing in the Florida Complex League of Minor League Baseball. Prior to 2021, the team was known as the Gulf Coast League Phillies. The team plays its home games at the Carpenter Complex, in Clearwater, Florida. The team is composed mainly of players who are in their first year of professional baseball as either draftees or non-drafted free agents from the United States, Canada, Dominican Republic, Venezuela, and various other countries.

History
The team first competed in the Gulf Coast League (GCL) in 1984, and has fielded at least one squad in the league continuously since then.

In 2009, the team played some games at the Joe DiMaggio Complex in Clearwater, Florida, while the Carpenter Complex was being renovated. The team also plays some home games at Bright House Field.

Beginning in the 2018 season, the Phillies have fielded two squads in the league, differentiate by "East" and "West" suffixes, originally based on the divisions (Northeast and Northwest) in which they competed. In 2019, both teams compete in the North division.

Prior to the 2021 season, the Gulf Coast League was renamed as the Florida Complex League (FCL). The Phillies returned to fielding a single team for the 2021 season.

Season-by-season

GCL Phillies East

GCL Phillies West

Rosters

Alumni
See: :Category:Florida Complex League Phillies players

References

External links
 Official website (East)
 Official website (West)

 
G
Florida Complex League teams
Baseball teams established in 1984
1984 establishments in Florida